Streamlining the cities: Government proposals for reorganising local government in Greater London and the Metropolitan counties was a government white paper issued in 1983, by the Conservative government of Margaret Thatcher which led to the abolition of the Greater London Council (GLC) and the metropolitan county councils (MCCs).

The white paper argued that most local services in Greater London and in the six metropolitan counties, were provided by the London boroughs, and by the Metropolitan district councils.  Specifically, GLC and the MCCs only provided 16% and 26% of services in their areas respectively - however the shire county councils provided 87% of services in their areas.  The white paper concluded therefore, that the latter's existence could be justified, whereas the GLC and the MCCs could not. It was also claimed that the GLC and the MCCs were profligate.   The white paper concluded that the GLC and the MCCs should be abolished and replaced by a system of joint boards, to take over some of the county council's functions. The white paper's proposals were largely implemented in the Local Government Act 1985. However, this was controversial as the GLC and MCCs were controlled by the Labour Party and led to accusations that their abolition was motivated by party politics.

External links  

The white paper's full text

Government reports
White papers
1983 in the United Kingdom
Local government in England
1983 documents